Munich is the capital and most populous city of the German state of Bavaria. With a population of 1,558,395 inhabitants as of 31 July 2020, it is the third-largest city in Germany, after Berlin and Hamburg, and thus the largest which does not constitute its own state, as well as the 11th-largest city in the European Union. The city's metropolitan region is home to 6 million people. Straddling the banks of the River Isar (a tributary of the Danube) north of the Bavarian Alps, Munich is the seat of the Bavarian administrative region of Upper Bavaria, while being the most densely populated municipality in Germany with 4,500 people per km2. Munich is the second-largest city in the Bavarian dialect area, after the Austrian capital of Vienna.

The city was first mentioned in 1158. Catholic Munich strongly resisted the Reformation and was a political point of divergence during the resulting Thirty Years' War, but remained physically untouched despite an occupation by the Protestant Swedes. Once Bavaria was established as a sovereign kingdom in 1806, Munich became a major European centre of arts, architecture, culture and science. In 1918, during the German Revolution of 1918–19, the ruling house of Wittelsbach, which had governed Bavaria since 1180, was forced to abdicate in Munich and a short-lived Bavarian Soviet Republic was declared. In the 1920s, Munich became home to several political factions, among them the Nazi Party. After the Nazis' rise to power, Munich was declared their "Capital of the Movement". The city was heavily bombed during World War II, but has restored most of its old town. After the end of postwar American occupation in 1949, there was a great increase in population and economic power during the years of Wirtschaftswunder, or "economic miracle". The city hosted the 1972 Summer Olympics.

Today, Munich is a global centre of art, science, technology, finance, publishing, culture, innovation, education, business, and tourism and enjoys a very high standard and quality of living, reaching first in Germany and third worldwide according to the 2018 Mercer survey, and being rated the world's most liveable city by the Monocle's Quality of Life Survey 2018. Munich is consistently ranked as one of the most expensive cities in Germany in terms of real estate prices and rental costs. According to the Globalization and World Rankings Research Institute, Munich is considered an alpha-world city, . It is one of the most prosperous and fastest growing cities in Germany. The city is home to more than 530,000 people of foreign background, making up 37.7% of its population.

Munich's economy is based on high tech, automobiles, the service sector and creative industries, as well as IT, biotechnology, engineering and electronics among many other sectors. It has one of the strongest economies of any German city and the lowest unemployment rate of all cities in Germany with more than 1 million inhabitants. Munich is also one of the most attractive business locations in Germany. The city houses many multinational companies, such as BMW, Siemens, MAN, Allianz and MunichRE. In addition, Munich is home to two research universities, a multitude of scientific institutions, and world-renowned technology and science museums like the Deutsches Museum and BMW Museum. Munich's numerous architectural and cultural attractions, sports events, exhibitions and its annual Oktoberfest, the world's largest Volksfest, attract considerable tourism.

History

Etymology
The name of the city is usually interpreted as deriving from the word Munichen in Old High German and Middle High German, meaning "by the monks". A monk is depicted in the Coat of arms of Munich.

The town is first mentioned as forum apud Munichen in the Augsburg Arbitration of 14 June 1158 by Holy Roman Emperor Frederick I.

The name in modern German is München, but this has been variously translated in different languages as "Munich", in Italian as "Monaco di Baviera", in Portuguese as "Munique".

Prehistory
The river Isar was a prehistoric trade route and in the Bronze Age Munich was among the largest raft ports in Europe. Evidence of Celtic settlements from the Iron Age have been discovered in areas around Perlach.

Roman period

The ancient Roman road Via Julia, which connected Augsburg and Salzburg, crossed over the Isar River south of modern-day Munich, at the towns of Baierbrunn and Gauting. A Roman settlement north-east of downtown Munich was excavated in the neighborhood of Denning/Bogenhausen.

Post-Roman settlements

In the 6th Century and beyond, various ethnic groups, such as the Baiuvarii, populated the area around what is now modern Munich, such as in Johanneskirchen, Feldmoching, Bogenhausen and Pasing. The first known Christian church was built ca. 815 in Fröttmanning.

Origin of medieval town

The first medieval bridges across the river Isar were located in current city areas of Munich and Landshut. The Duke of Saxony and Bavaria Henry the Lion founded the town of Munich in his territory to control the salt trade, after having burned town the town of Föhring and its bridges over the river Isar. Historians date this event at about 1158. The layout of Munich city, with five city gates and market place, resembled that of Höxter.

Henry built a new toll bridge, customs house and a coin market closer to his home somewhat upstream at a settlement around the area of modern old town Munich. This new toll bridge most likely crossed the Isar where the Museuminsel and the modern Ludwigsbrücke is now located.

Otto of Freising protested to his nephew, Emperor Frederick Barbarosa (d. 1190). However, on 14 June 1158, in Augsburg, the conflict was settled in favor of Duke Henry. The Augsburg Arbitration mentions the name of the location in dispute as forum apud Munichen. Although Bishop Otto had lost his bridge, the arbiters ordered Duke Henry to pay a third of his income to the Bishop in Freising as compensation.

The 14. June 1158 is considered the official founding day of the city of Munich. Archaeological excavations at Marienhof Square (near Marienplatz) in advance of the expansion of the S-Bahn (subway) in 2012 discovered shards of vessels from the 11th century, which prove again that the settlement of Munich must be older than the Augsburg Arbitration of 1158. The old St. Peter's Church near Marienplatz is also believed to predate the founding date of the town.

In 1175, Munich received city status and fortification. In 1180, after Henry the Lion's fall from grace with Emperor Frederick Barbarosa, including his trial and exile, Otto I Wittelsbach became Duke of Bavaria, and Munich was handed to the Bishop of Freising. In 1240, Munich was transferred to Otto II Wittelsbach and in 1255, when the Duchy of Bavaria was split in two, Munich became the ducal residence of Upper Bavaria.

Duke Louis IV, a native of Munich, was elected German king in 1314 and crowned as Holy Roman Emperor in 1328. He strengthened the city's position by granting it the salt monopoly, thus assuring it of additional income.

On 13 February 1327, a large fire broke out in Munich that lasted two days and destroyed about a third of the town.

In 1349, the Black Death ravaged Munich and Bavaria.

In the 15th century, Munich underwent a revival of Gothic arts: the Old Town Hall was enlarged, and Munich's largest Gothic church – the Frauenkirche – now a cathedral, was constructed in only 20 years, starting in 1468.

Capital of reunited Bavaria

When Bavaria was reunited in 1506 after a brief war against the Duchy of Landshut, Munich became its capital. The arts and politics became increasingly influenced by the court. The Renaissance movement beset Munich and the Bavarian branch of the House of Wittelsbach under the Duke of Bavaria Albrecht V bolstered their prestige by conjuring up a lineage that reached back to Classical antiquity. In 1568 Albrecht V built the Antiquarium to house the Wittelsbach collection of Greek and Roman antiquities in the Munich Residenz. Albrecht V appointed the composer Orlando di Lasso as director of the court orchestra and tempted numerous Italian musicians to work at the Munich court, establishing Munich as a hub for late Renaissance music. During the rule of Duke William V Munich began to be called the "German Rome" and William V began presenting Emperor Charlemagne as ancestor of the Wittelsbach dynasty.

Duke William V further cemented the Wittelsbach rule by commissioning the Jesuit Michaelskirche. He had the sermons of his Jesuit court preacher Jeremias Drexel translated from Latin into German and published them to a greater audience. William V was addressed with the epithet "the Pious" and like his contemporary Wittelsbach dukes promoted himself as "father of the land" (Landesvater), encouraged pilgrimages and Marian devotions. William V had the Hofbräuhaus built in 1589. It would become the prototype for beer halls across Munich. After World War II the Residenze, the Hofbräuhaus, the Frauenkirche, and the Peterskirche were reconstructed to look exactly as they did before the Nazi Party seized power in 1933.

The Catholic League was founded in Munich in 1609. In 1623, during the Thirty Years' War (1618-1648), Munich became an electoral residence when Maximilian I, Duke of Bavaria was invested with the electoral dignity, but in 1632 the city was occupied by Gustav II Adolph of Sweden.  

In 1634 Swedish and Spanish troops advanced on Munich. Maximilian I published a plague ordinance to halt an epidemic escalation. The bubonic plague nevertheless ravaged Munich and the surrounding countryside in 1634 and 1635. During the Thirty Years' War (1618-1648) troops again converged on Munich in 1647 and precautions were taken, so as to avoid another epidemic.

Under the regency of the Bavarian electors, Munich was an important centre of Baroque life, but also had to suffer under Habsburg occupations in 1704 and 1742.

In 1777 Bavarian lands were inherited to Karl Theodor, Duke in Bavaria, after the last Bavarian Wittelsbach had died childless. The new Duke was disliked by the citizens of Munich for his supposedly enlightened ideas. In 1785 Karl Theodor invited Count Rumford Benjamin Thompson to take up residency in Munich and implement stringent social reforms. The poor were forced to live in newly built workhouses. The Bavarian army was restructured, with common soldiers receiving better food and reassurances that they would be treated humanely by officers. Munich was the largest German city to loose fortification in the 1790s. In 1791 Karl Theodor and Count Rumford started to demolish Munich's fortifications. After 1793 Munich's citizens, including house servants, carpenters, butchers, merchants, and court officials, seized the opportunity, building new houses, stalls, and sheds outside the city walls.

After making an alliance with Napoleonic France, the city became the capital of the new Kingdom of Bavaria in 1806 with Elector Maximillian Joseph becoming its first King. The state parliament (the Landtag) and the new archdiocese of Munich and Freising were also located in the city.

The establishment of Bavarian state sovereignty profoundly affected Munich. Munich became the center of a modernizing kingdom, and one of the king's first acts was the secularization of Bavaria. He had dissolved all monasteries in 1802 and once crowned, Max Joseph I generated state revenues by selling off church lands. While many monasteries were reestablished, Max Joseph I succeeded in controlling the right to brew beer (Brauchrecht). The king handed the brewing monopoly to Munich's wealthiest brewers, who in turn paid substantial taxs on their beer production. In 1807 the king abolished all ordinances that limited the number of apprentices and journeymen a brewery could employ. Munich's population had swelled and Munich brewers were now free to employ as many workers as they needed to meet the demand. In October 1810 a beer festival was held on the meadows just outside Munich to commemorate the wedding of the crown price and princess Therese of Saxe-Hildburghausen. The parades in regional dress (Tracht) represented the diversity of the kingdom. The fields are now part of the Theresienwiese and the celebrations developed into Munich's annual Oktoberfest.

The Bavarian state proceeded to take control over the beer market, by regulating all taxes on beer in 1806 and 1811. Brewers and the beer taverns (Wirtshäuser) were taxed, and the state also controlled the quality of beer while limiting the competition among breweries. In 1831 the king's government introduced a cost-of-living allowance on beer for lower-ranking civil servants and soldiers. Soldiers stationed in Munich were granted a daily allowance for beer in the early 1840s. By the 1850s beer had become essential staple food for Munich's working and lower classes. Since the Middle Ages beer had been regarded as nutritious liquid bread (fließendes Brot) in Bavaria. But Munich suffered from poor water sanitation and as early as the 1700s beer came to be regarded as the fifth element. Beer was essential in maintaining public health in Munich and in the mid 1840s Munich police estimated that at least 40,000 residents relied primarily on beer for their nutrition.

During the early to mid-19th century, the old fortified city walls of Munich were largely demolished due to population expansion. The first Munich railway station was built in 1839, with a line going to Augsburg in the west. By 1849 a newer Munich Central Train Station (München Hauptbahnhof) was completed, with a line going to Landshut and Regensburg in the north. In 1825 Ludwig I ascended to the throne and commissioned leading architects such as Leo von Klenze to design a series of public museums in neoclassical style. The grand building projects of Ludwig I got Munich the endearment "Isar-Athen" and "Monaco di Bavaria".

By the time Ludwig II became king in 1864, he remained mostly aloof from his capital and focused more on his fanciful castles in the Bavarian countryside, which is why he is known the world over as the 'fairytale king'. Ludwig II tried to lure Richard Wagner to Munich, but his plans for an opera house were declined by the city council. Ludwig II nevertheless generated a windfall for Munich's craft and construction industries. In 1876 Munich hosted the first German Art and Industry Exhibition, which showcased the northern Neo-Renaissance fashion that came to be the German Empire's predominant style. Munich based artists put on the German National Applied Arts Exhibition in 1888, showcasing Baroque Revival architecture and Rococo Revival designs.

The Prince Regent Luitpold's reign from 1886 till 1912 was marked by tremendous artistic and cultural activity in Munich. At the dawn of the 20th century Munich was an epicenter for the Jugendstil movement, combining a liberal magazine culture with progressive industrial design and architecture. The German art movement took its name from the Munich magazine Die Jugend (The Youth). Prominent Munich Jugendstil artists include Hans Eduard von Berlepsch-Valendas, Otto Eckmann, Margarethe von Brauchitsch, August Endell, Hermann Obrist, Wilhelm von Debschitz, and Richard Riemerschmid. In 1905 two large department stores opened in Munich, the Kaufhaus Oberpollinger and the Warenhaus Hermann Tietz, both had been designed by the architect Max Littmann. In 1911 the expressionist group Der Blaue Reiter was established in Munich. Its founding members include Gabriele Münter.

World War I to World War II

Following the outbreak of World War I in 1914, life in Munich became very difficult, as the Allied blockade of Germany led to food and fuel shortages. During French air raids in 1916, three bombs fell on Munich.

In 1916, the 'Bayerische Motoren Werke' (BMW) produced its first aircraft engine in Munich. The stock cooperation BMW AG was founded in 1918, with Camillo Castiglioni owning one third of the share capital. In 1922 BMW relocated its headquarters to a factory in Munich.

After World War I, the city was at the centre of substantial political unrest. In November 1918, on the eve of the German revolution, Ludwig III of Bavaria and his family fled the city. After the murder of the first republican premier of Bavaria Kurt Eisner in February 1919 by Anton Graf von Arco auf Valley, the Bavarian Soviet Republic was proclaimed. In Mein Kampf Adolf Hitler described his political activism in Munich after November 1918 as the "Beginning of My Political Activity". Hitler called the shotlived Bavarian Soviet Republic "the rule of the Jews". In 1919 Bavaria Film was founded and in the 1920s Munich offered film makers an alternative to Germany's largest film studio in Babelsberg.

In 1923, Adolf Hitler and his supporters, who were concentrated in Munich, staged the Beer Hall Putsch, an attempt to overthrow the Weimar Republic and seize power. The revolt failed, resulting in Hitler's arrest and the temporary crippling of the Nazi Party (NSDAP). The city again became important to the Nazis when they took power in Germany in 1933. Because of its importance to the rise of National Socialism, Munich was referred to as the Hauptstadt der Bewegung ("Capital of the Movement").

The NSDAP headquarters and the documentation apparatus for controlling all aspects of life were located in Munich. Nazi organizations, such as the National Socialist Women's League and the Gestapo, had their offices along Brienner Straße and around the Königsplatz. The party acquired 68 buildings in the area and many Führerbauten ("Führer buildings") were built to reflect a new aesthetic of power. Construction work for the Führerbau and the party headquarters (known as the Brown House) started in September 1933. The Haus der Kunst (House of German Art) was the first building to be commissioned by Hitler. The architect Paul Troost was asked to start work shortly after the Nazis had seized power because "the most German of all German cities" was left with no exhibition building when in 1931 the Glass Palace was destroyed in an arson.

In March 1924, Munich broadcast its first radio program. The station became 'Bayerischer Rundfunk' in 1931.

The city was the site where the 1938 Munich Agreement signed between Britain and France with Nazi Germany as part of the Franco-British policy of appeasement. The British Prime Minister Neville Chamberlain assented to the German annexation of Czechoslovakia's Sudetenland region in the hopes of satisfying Hitler's territorial expansion.

The Munich-Riem Airport was completed in October 1939, in the area of Riem. The airport was moved closer to Freising in 1992.

On November 8, 1939, shortly after the Second World War had begun, a Georg Elser planted a bomb in the Bürgerbräukeller in Munich in an attempt to assassinate Adolf Hitler, who held a political party speech. Hitler, however, had left the building minutes before the bomb went off. By mid 1942 the majority of Jews living in Munich and the suburbs had been deported.

Munich was the base of the White Rose, a student resistance movement. The group had distributed leaflets in several cities and following the 1943 Battle of Stalingrad members of the group stenciled slogans such as "Down with Hitler" and "Hitler the Mass Murderer" on public buildings in Munich. The core members were arrested and executed after Sophie Scholl and her brother Hans Scholl were caught distributing leaflets on Munich University campus calling upon the youth to rise against Hitler.

The city was heavily damaged by Allied bombing during World War II, with 71 air raids over five years. US troops liberated Munich on April 30, 1945.

Postwar
After US occupation in 1945, Munich was completely rebuilt following a meticulous plan, which preserved its pre-war street grid, bar a few exceptions owing to then modern traffic concepts. In 1957, Munich's population surpassed one million. The city continued to play a highly significant role in the German economy, politics and culture, giving rise to its nickname Heimliche Hauptstadt ("secret capital") in the decades after World War II. In Munich, the Bayerischer Rundfunk began its first television broadcast in 1954.

The Free State of Bavaria used the arms industry as kernel for its high tech development policy. Since 1963, Munich has been hosting the Munich Security Conference, held annually in the Hotel Bayerischer Hof. Munich also became known on the political level due to the strong influence of Bavarian politician Franz Josef Strauss from the 1960s to the 1980s. The Munich Airport, which commenced operations in 1992, was named in his honor. 

Munich hosted the 1972 Summer Olympics. After winning the bid in 1966 the Mayor of Munich Hans-Jochen Vogel accelerated the construction of the U-Bahn subway and the S-Bahn metropolitan commuter railway. In May 1967 the construction work began for a new U-Bahn line connecting the city with the Olympic Park. The Olympic Park subway station was built near the BMW Headquarters and the line was completed May 1972, three months before the opening of the 1972 Summer Olympics. Shortly before the opening ceremony, Munich also inaugurated a sizable pedestrian priority zone between Klarlsplatz and Marienplatz. In 1970 the Munich city council released funds so that the iconic gothic facade and Glockenspiel of the New City Hall (Neues Rathaus) could be restored.

During 1972 Summer Olympics 11 Israeli athletes were murdered by Palestinian terrorists in the Munich massacre, when gunmen from the Palestinian "Black September" group took hostage members of the Israeli Olympic team. 

The most deadly militant attack the Federal Republic of Germany has ever witnessed, was the Oktoberfest bombing. The attack was eventually blamed on militant Neo-Nazism.

Munich and its urban sprawl emerged as leading German high tech region during the 1980s and 1990s. The urban economy of Munich became characterized by a dynamic labour market, low unemployment, a growing service economy and high per capita income. Munich is home of the famous Nockherberg Strong Beer Festival during the Lenten fasting period (usually in March). Its origins go back to the 17th/18th century, but has become popular when the festivities were first televised in the 1980s. The fest includes comical speeches and a mini-musical in which numerous German politicians are parodied by look-alike actors.

In 2007 the ecological restoration of the river Isar in the urban area of Munich was awarded the Water Development Prize by the German Association for Water, Wastewater and Waste (known as DWA in German). The renaturation of the Isar allows for the near natural development of the river bed and is part of Munich's flood protection. About 20 percent of buildings in Munich now have a green roof, the Munich city council has been encouraging better stormwater management since the 1990s with regulations and subsidies.

On the fifth anniversary of the 2011 Norway attacks an active shooter perpetrated hate crime. The 2016 Munich shooting aimed at killing people of Turkish and Arab descent.

Munich was one of the host cities for UEFA Euro 2020, which was delayed for a year due to the COVID-19 pandemic in Germany, and is planned to be a host city for UEFA Euro 2024.

Geography

Topography
The local rivers are the Isar and the Würm. Munich is situated in the Northern Alpine Foreland. The northern part of this sandy plateau includes a highly fertile flint area which is no longer affected by the folding processes found in the Alps, while the southern part is covered with morainic hills. Between these are fields of fluvio-glacial out-wash, such as around Munich. Wherever these deposits get thinner, the ground water can permeate the gravel surface and flood the area, leading to marshes as in the north of Munich.

Climate
By Köppen classification templates and updated data the climate is oceanic (Cfb), independent of the isotherm but with some humid continental (Dfb) features like warm to hot summers and cold winters, but without permanent snow cover. The proximity to the Alps brings higher volumes of rainfall and consequently greater susceptibility to flood problems. Studies of adaptation to climate change and extreme events are carried out, one of them is the Isar Plan of the EU Adaptation Climate.

The city centre lies between both climates, while the airport of Munich has a humid continental climate. The warmest month, on average, is July. The coolest is January.

Showers and thunderstorms bring the highest average monthly precipitation in late spring and throughout the summer. The most precipitation occurs in July, on average. Winter tends to have less precipitation, the least in February.

The higher elevation and proximity to the Alps cause the city to have more rain and snow than many other parts of Germany. The Alps affect the city's climate in other ways too; for example, the warm downhill wind from the Alps (föhn wind), which can raise temperatures sharply within a few hours even in the winter.

Being at the centre of Europe, Munich is subject to many climatic influences, so that weather conditions there are more variable than in other European cities, especially those further west and south of the Alps.

Climate change
In Munich, the general trend of global warming with a rise of medium yearly temperatures of about 1 °C in Germany over the last 120 years can be observed as well. In November 2016 the city council concluded officially that a further rise in medium temperature, a higher number of heat extremes, a rise in the number of hot days and nights with temperatures higher than 20 °C (tropical nights), a change in precipitation patterns, as well as a rise in the number of local instances of heavy rain, is to be expected as part of the ongoing climate change. The city administration decided to support a joint study from its own Referat für Gesundheit und Umwelt (department for health and environmental issues) and the German Meteorological Service that will gather data on local weather. The data is supposed to be used to create a plan for action for adapting the city to better deal with climate change as well as an integrated action program for climate protection in Munich. With the help of those programs issues regarding spatial planning and settlement density, the development of buildings and green spaces as well as plans for functioning ventilation in a cityscape can be monitored and managed.

Demographics

From only 24,000 inhabitants in 1700, the city population doubled about every 30 years. It was 100,000 in 1852, 250,000 in 1883 and 500,000 in 1901. Since then, Munich has become Germany's third-largest city. In 1933, 840,901 inhabitants were counted, and in 1957 over 1 million.

Immigration
In July 2017, Munich had 1.42 million inhabitants; 421,832 foreign nationals resided in the city as of 31 December 2017 with 50.7% of these residents being citizens of EU member states, and 25.2% citizens in European states not in the EU (including Russia and Turkey). The largest groups of foreign nationals were Turks (39,204), Croats (33,177), Italians (27,340), Greeks (27,117), Poles (27,945), Austrians (21,944), and Romanians (18,085).

Religion
About 45% of Munich's residents are not affiliated with any religious group; this ratio represents the fastest growing segment of the population. As in the rest of Germany, the Catholic and Protestant churches have experienced a continuous decline in membership. As of 31 December 2017, 31.8% of the city's inhabitants were Catholic, 11.4% Protestant, 0.3% Jewish, and 3.6% were members of an Orthodox Church (Eastern Orthodox or Oriental Orthodox). About 1% adhere to other Christian denominations. There is also a small Old Catholic parish and an English-speaking parish of the Episcopal Church in the city. According to Munich Statistical Office, in 2013 about 8.6% of Munich's population was Muslim.

Government and politics 

As the capital of Bavaria, Munich is an important political centre for both the state and country as a whole. It is the seat of the Landtag of Bavaria, the State Chancellery, and all state departments. Several national and international authorities are located in Munich, including the Federal Finance Court of Germany, the German Patent Office and the European Patent Office.

Mayor
The current mayor of Munich is Dieter Reiter of the centre-left Social Democratic Party (SPD), who was elected in 2014 and re-elected in 2020. Munich has a much stronger left-wing tradition than the rest of the state, which has been dominated by the conservative Christian Social Union in Bavaria (CSU) on a federal, state, and local level since the establishment of the Federal Republic in 1949. Munich, by contrast, has been governed by the SPD for all but six years since 1948. As of the 2020 local elections, green and centre-left parties also hold a majority in the city council (Stadtrat).

The most recent mayoral election was held on 15 March 2020, with a runoff held on 29 March, and the results were as follows:

! rowspan=2 colspan=2|Candidate
! rowspan=2|Party
! colspan=2|First round
! colspan=2|Second round
|-
! Votes
! %
! Votes
! %
|-
|bgcolor=|
|align=left|Dieter Reiter
|align=left|Social Democratic Party
|259,928
|47.9
|401,856
|71.7
|-
|bgcolor=|
|align=left|Kristina Frank
|align=left|Christian Social Union
|115,795
|21.3
|158,773
|28.3
|-
|bgcolor=|
|align=left|Katrin Habenschaden
|align=left|Alliance 90/The Greens
|112,121
|20.7
|-
|bgcolor=|
|align=left|Wolfgang Wiehle
|align=left|Alternative for Germany
|14,988
|2.8
|-
|bgcolor=|
|align=left|Tobias Ruff
|align=left|Ecological Democratic Party
|8,464
|1.6
|-
|bgcolor=|
|align=left|Jörg Hoffmann
|align=left|Free Democratic Party
|8,201
|1.5
|-
|bgcolor=|
|align=left|Thomas Lechner
|align=left|The Left
|7,232
|1.3
|-
|bgcolor=#007E82|
|align=left|Hans-Peter Mehling
|align=left|Free Voters of Bavaria
|5,003
|0.9
|-
|bgcolor=|
|align=left|Moritz Weixler
|align=left|Die PARTEI
|3,508
|0.6
|-
|
|align=left|Dirk Höpner
|align=left|Munich List
|1,966
|0.4
|-
|bgcolor=|
|align=left|Richard Progl
|align=left|Bavaria Party
|1,958
|0.4
|-
|
|align=left|Ender Beyhan-Bilgin
|align=left|FAIR
|1,483
|0.3
|-
|
|align=left|Stephanie Dilba
|align=left|mut
|1,267
|0.2
|-
|
|align=left|Cetin Oraner
|align=left|Together Bavaria
|819
|0.2
|-
! colspan=3|Valid votes
! 542,733
! 99.6
! 560,629
! 99.7
|-
! colspan=3|Invalid votes
! 1,997
! 0.4
! 1,616
! 0.3
|-
! colspan=3|Total
! 544,730
! 100.0
! 562,245
! 100.0
|-
! colspan=3|Electorate/voter turnout
! 1,110,571
! 49.0
! 1,109,032
! 50.7
|-
|colspan=7|Source: Wahlen München (1st round, 2nd round)
|}

City council

The Munich city council (Stadtrat) governs the city alongside the Mayor. The most recent city council election was held on 15 March 2020, and the results were as follows:

! colspan=2|Party
! Lead candidate
! Votes
! %
! +/-
! Seats
! +/-
|-
|bgcolor=|
|align=left|Alliance 90/The Greens (Grüne)
|align=left|Katrin Habenschaden
|11,762,516
|29.1
| 12.5
|23
| 10
|-
|bgcolor=|
|align=left|Christian Social Union (CSU)
|align=left|Kristina Frank
|9,986,014
|24.7
| 7.8
|20
| 6
|-
|bgcolor=|
|align=left|Social Democratic Party (SPD)
|align=left|Dieter Reiter
|8,884,562
|22.0
| 8.8
|18
| 7
|-
|bgcolor=|
|align=left|Ecological Democratic Party (ÖDP)
|align=left|Tobias Ruff
|1,598,539
|4.0
| 1.4
|3
| 1
|-
|bgcolor=|
|align=left|Alternative for Germany (AfD)
|align=left|Iris Wassill
|1,559,476
|3.9
| 1.4
|3
| 1
|-
|bgcolor=|
|align=left|Free Democratic Party (FDP)
|align=left|Jörg Hoffmann
|1,420,194
|3.5
| 0.1
|3
|±0
|-
|bgcolor=|
|align=left|The Left (Die Linke)
|align=left|Stefan Jagel
|1,319,464
|3.3
| 0.8
|3
| 1
|-
|bgcolor=#007E82|
|align=left|Free Voters of Bavaria (FW)
|align=left|Hans-Peter Mehling
|1,008,400
|2.5
| 0.2
|2
|±0
|-
|bgcolor=|
|align=left|Volt Germany (Volt)
|align=left|Felix Sproll
|732,853
|1.8
|New
|1
|New
|-
|bgcolor=|
|align=left|Die PARTEI (PARTEI)
|align=left|Marie Burneleit
|528,949
|1.3
|New
|1
|New
|-
|bgcolor=deeppink|
|align=left|Pink List (Rosa Liste)
|align=left|Thomas Niederbühl
|396,324
|1.0
| 0.9
|1
|±0
|-
|
|align=left|Munich List
|align=left|Dirk Höpner
|339,705
|0.8
|New
|1
|New
|-
|bgcolor=|
|align=left|Bavaria Party (BP)
|align=left|Richard Progl
|273,737
|0.7
| 0.2
|1
|±0
|-
|
|align=left|mut
|align=left|Stephanie Dilba
|247,679
|0.6
|New
|0
|New
|-
|
|align=left|FAIR
|align=left|Kemal Orak
|142,455
|0.4
|New
|0
|New
|-
|
|align=left|Together Bavaria (ZuBa)
|align=left|Cetin Oraner
|120,975
|0.3
|New
|0
|New
|-
|
|align=left|BIA
|align=left|Karl Richter
|86,358
|0.2
| 0.5
|0
|±0
|-
! colspan=3|Valid votes
! 531,527
! 97.6
! 
! 
! 
|-
! colspan=3|Invalid votes
! 12,937
! 2.4
! 
! 
! 
|-
! colspan=3|Total
! 544,464
! 100.0
! 
! 80
! ±0
|-
! colspan=3|Electorate/voter turnout
! 1,110,571
! 49.0
!  7.0
! 
! 
|-
|colspan=8|Source: Wahlen München
|}

State Landtag
In the Landtag of Bavaria, Munich is divided between nine constituencies. After the 2018 Bavarian state election, the composition and representation of each was as follows:

Federal parliament 
In the Bundestag, Munich is divided between four constituencies. In the 20th Bundestag, the composition and representation of each was as follows:

Sister cities

Munich is twinned with the following cities (date of agreement shown in parentheses): Edinburgh, Scotland (1954), Verona, Italy (March 17, 1960), Bordeaux, France (1964), Sapporo, Japan (1972), Cincinnati, Ohio, United States (1989), Kyiv, Ukraine (1989), Harare, Zimbabwe (1996) and Beersheba, Israel (2022).

Subdivisions

Since the administrative reform in 1992, Munich is divided into 25 boroughs or Stadtbezirke, which themselves consist of smaller quarters.

Allach-Untermenzing (23), Altstadt-Lehel (1), Aubing-Lochhausen-Langwied (22), Au-Haidhausen (5), Berg am Laim (14), Bogenhausen (13), Feldmoching-Hasenbergl (24), Hadern (20), Laim (25), Ludwigsvorstadt-Isarvorstadt (2), Maxvorstadt (3), Milbertshofen-Am Hart (11), Moosach (10), Neuhausen-Nymphenburg (9), Obergiesing (17), Pasing-Obermenzing (21), Ramersdorf-Perlach (16), Schwabing-Freimann (12), Schwabing-West (4), Schwanthalerhöhe (8), Sendling (6), Sendling-Westpark (7), Thalkirchen-Obersendling-Forstenried-Fürstenried-Solln (19), Trudering-Riem (15) and Untergiesing-Harlaching (18).

Architecture

The city has an eclectic mix of historic and modern architecture because historic buildings destroyed in World War II were reconstructed, and new landmarks were built. A survey by the Society's Centre for Sustainable Destinations for the National Geographic Traveller chose over 100 historic destinations around the world and ranked Munich 30th.

Inner city

At the centre of the city is the Marienplatz – a large open square named after the Mariensäule, a Marian column in its centre – with the Old and the New Town Hall. Its tower contains the Rathaus-Glockenspiel. Three gates of the demolished medieval fortification survive – the Isartor in the east, the Sendlinger Tor in the south and the Karlstor in the west of the inner city. The Karlstor leads up to the Stachus, a square dominated by the Justizpalast (Palace of Justice) and a fountain.

The Peterskirche close to Marienplatz is the oldest church of the inner city. It was first built during the Romanesque period, and was the focus of the early monastic settlement in Munich before the city's official foundation in 1158. Nearby St. Peter the Gothic hall-church Heiliggeistkirche (The Church of the Holy Spirit) was converted to baroque style from 1724 onwards and looks down upon the Viktualienmarkt.

The Frauenkirche serves as the cathedral for the Catholic Archdiocese of Munich and Freising. The nearby Michaelskirche is the largest renaissance church north of the Alps, while the Theatinerkirche is a basilica in Italianate high baroque, which had a major influence on Southern German baroque architecture. Its dome dominates the Odeonsplatz. Other baroque churches in the inner city include the Bürgersaalkirche, the Trinity Church and the St. Anna Damenstiftskirche. The Asamkirche was endowed and built by the Brothers Asam, pioneering artists of the rococo period.

The large Residenz palace complex (begun in 1385) on the edge of Munich's Old Town, Germany's largest urban palace, ranks among Europe's most significant museums of interior decoration. Having undergone several extensions, it contains also the treasury and the splendid rococo Cuvilliés Theatre. Next door to the Residenz the neo-classical opera, the National Theatre was erected. Among the baroque and neoclassical mansions which still exist in Munich are the Palais Porcia, the Palais Preysing, the Palais Holnstein and the Prinz-Carl-Palais. All mansions are situated close to the Residenz, same as the Alte Hof, a medieval castle and first residence of the Wittelsbach dukes in Munich.

Lehel, a middle-class quarter east of the Altstadt, is characterised by numerous well-preserved townhouses. The St. Anna im Lehel is the first rococo church in Bavaria. St. Lukas is the largest Protestant Church in Munich.

Royal avenues and squares

Four grand royal avenues of the 19th century with official buildings connect Munich's inner city with its then-suburbs:

The neoclassical Brienner Straße, starting at Odeonsplatz on the northern fringe of the Old Town close to the Residenz, runs from east to west and opens into the Königsplatz, designed with the "Doric" Propyläen, the "Ionic" Glyptothek and the "Corinthian" State Museum of Classical Art, behind it St. Boniface's Abbey was erected. The area around Königsplatz is home to the Kunstareal, Munich's gallery and museum quarter (as described below).

Ludwigstraße also begins at Odeonsplatz and runs from south to north, skirting the Ludwig-Maximilians-Universität, the St. Louis church, the Bavarian State Library and numerous state ministries and palaces. The southern part of the avenue was constructed in Italian renaissance style, while the north is strongly influenced by Italian Romanesque architecture. The
Siegestor (gate of victory) sits at the northern end of Ludwigstraße, where the latter passes over into Leopoldstraße and the district of Schwabing begins.

The neo-Gothic Maximilianstraße starts at Max-Joseph-Platz, where the Residenz and the National Theatre are situated, and runs from west to east. The avenue is framed by elaborately structured neo-Gothic buildings which house, among others, the Schauspielhaus, the Building of the district government of Upper Bavaria and the Museum of Ethnology. After crossing the river Isar, the avenue circles the Maximilianeum, which houses the state parliament. The western portion of Maximilianstraße is known for its designer shops, luxury boutiques, jewellery stores, and one of Munich's foremost five-star hotels, the Hotel Vier Jahreszeiten.

Prinzregentenstraße runs parallel to Maximilianstraße and begins at Prinz-Carl-Palais. Many museums are on the avenue, such as the Haus der Kunst, the Bavarian National Museum and the Schackgalerie. The avenue crosses the Isar and circles the Friedensengel monument, then passing the Villa Stuck and Hitler's old apartment. The Prinzregententheater is at Prinzregentenplatz further to the east.

Other boroughs

In Schwabing and Maxvorstadt, many beautiful streets with continuous rows of Gründerzeit buildings can be found. Rows of elegant town houses and spectacular urban palais in many colours, often elaborately decorated with ornamental details on their façades, make up large parts of the areas west of Leopoldstraße (Schwabing's main shopping street), while in the eastern areas between Leopoldstraße and Englischer Garten similar buildings alternate with almost rural-looking houses and whimsical mini-castles, often decorated with small towers. Numerous tiny alleys and shady lanes connect the larger streets and little plazas of the area, conveying the legendary artist's quarter's flair and atmosphere convincingly like it was at the turn of the 20th century. The wealthy district of Bogenhausen in the east of Munich is another little-known area (at least among tourists) rich in extravagant architecture, especially around Prinzregentenstraße. One of Bogenhausen's most beautiful buildings is Villa Stuck, famed residence of painter Franz von Stuck.

Two large Baroque palaces in Nymphenburg and Oberschleissheim are reminders of Bavaria's royal past. Schloss Fürstenried (Fürstenried Palace), a baroque palace of similar structure to Nymphenburg but of much smaller size, was erected around the same time in the south west of Munich.

The second large Baroque residence is Schloss Schleissheim (Schleissheim Palace), located in the suburb of Oberschleissheim, a palace complex encompassing three separate residences: Altes Schloss Schleissheim (the old palace), Neues Schloss Schleissheim (the new palace) and Schloss Lustheim (Lustheim Palace). Most parts of the palace complex serve as museums and art galleries. Deutsches Museum's Flugwerft Schleissheim flight exhibition centre is located nearby, on the Schleissheim Special Landing Field. The Bavaria statue before the neo-classical Ruhmeshalle is a monumental, bronze sand-cast 19th-century statue at Theresienwiese. The Grünwald castle is the only medieval castle in the Munich area which still exists.

St Michael in Berg am Laim is a church in the suburbs. Another church of Johann Michael Fischer is St George in Bogenhausen. Most of the boroughs have parish churches that originate from the Middle Ages, such as the church of pilgrimage St Mary in Ramersdorf. The oldest church within the city borders is Heilig Kreuz in Fröttmaning next to the Allianz Arena, known for its Romanesque fresco. Moosach features one of the oldest churches, Alt-St. Martin, but a larger one was built in 1925.

Especially in its suburbs, Munich features a wide and diverse array of modern architecture, although strict culturally sensitive height limitations for buildings have limited the construction of skyscrapers to avoid a loss of views to the distant Bavarian Alps. Most high-rise buildings are clustered at the northern edge of Munich in the skyline, like the Hypo-Haus, the Arabella High-Rise Building, the Highlight Towers, Uptown Munich, Münchner Tor and the BMW Headquarters next to the Olympic Park. Several other high-rise buildings are located near the city centre and on the Siemens campus in southern Munich. A landmark of modern Munich is also the architecture of the sport stadiums (as described below).

In Fasangarten is the former McGraw Kaserne, a former US army base, near Stadelheim Prison.

Parks

Munich is a densely-built city but has numerous public parks. In 1789, the Englischer Garten was created just north of Munich's old city center. It contains a naturist (nudist) area, numerous bicycle and jogging tracks as well as bridle-paths. It was designed and laid out by Benjamin Thompson, Count Rumford, both for pleasure and as a work area for the city's vagrants and homeless. 

Nowadays the Englischer Garten a park, its southern half being dominated by wide-open areas, hills, monuments and beach-like stretches (along the streams Eisbach and Schwabinger Bach). In contrast, its less-frequented northern part is much quieter, with many old trees and thick undergrowth. Multiple beer gardens can be found in both parts of the Englischer Garten, the most well-known being located at the Chinese Pagoda.

Other large green spaces are the modern Olympiapark, the Westpark, and the parks of Nymphenburg Palace (with the Botanischer Garten München-Nymphenburg to the north), and Schleissheim Palace. The city's oldest park is the Hofgarten, near the Residenz, dating back to the 16th century. The site of the largest beer garden in town, the former royal Hirschgarten was founded in 1780 for deer, which still live there. Another notable park is Ostpark located in the Ramersdorf-Perlach borough which also houses the Michaelibad, the largest water park in Munich.

Sports

Football

Munich is home to several professional football teams including Bayern Munich, Germany's most successful club and a multiple UEFA Champions League winner. Other notable clubs include 1860 Munich, who were long time their rivals on a somewhat equal footing, but currently play in the 3rd Division 3. Liga, and former Bundesliga club SpVgg Unterhaching, who currently play in the Regionalliga Bayern, in Germany's 4th division.

Basketball
FC Bayern Munich Basketball is currently playing in the Beko Basket Bundesliga. The city hosted the final stages of the FIBA EuroBasket 1993, where the German national basketball team won the gold medal.

Ice hockey
The city's ice hockey club is EHC Red Bull München who play in the Deutsche Eishockey Liga. The team has won three DEL Championships, in 2016, 2017 and 2018.

Olympics

Munich hosted the 1972 Summer Olympics; the Munich Massacre took place in the Olympic village. It was one of the host cities for the 2006 Football World Cup, which was not held in Munich's Olympic Stadium, but in a new football specific stadium, the Allianz Arena. Munich bid to host the 2018 Winter Olympic Games, but lost to Pyeongchang. In September 2011 the DOSB President Thomas Bach confirmed that Munich would bid again for the Winter Olympics in the future. These plans were abandoned some time later.

Road running

Regular annual road running events in Munich are the Munich Marathon in October, the Stadtlauf end of June, the company run B2Run in July, the New Year's Run on 31 December, the Spartan Race Sprint, the Olympia Alm Crosslauf and the Bestzeitenmarathon.

Swimming

Public sporting facilities in Munich include ten indoor swimming pools and eight outdoor swimming pools, which are operated by the Munich City Utilities (SWM) communal company. Popular indoor swimming pools include the Olympia Schwimmhalle of the 1972 Summer Olympics, the wave pool Cosimawellenbad, as well as the Müllersches Volksbad which was built in 1901. Further, swimming within Munich's city limits is also possible in several artificial lakes such as for example the Riemer See or the Langwieder lake district.

River surfing
Munich has a reputation as a surfing hotspot, offering the world's best known river surfing spot, the Eisbach wave, which is located at the southern edge of the Englischer Garten park and used by surfers day and night and throughout the year. Half a kilometre down the river, there is a second, easier wave for beginners, the so-called Kleine Eisbachwelle. Two further surf spots within the city are located along the river Isar, the wave in the Floßlände channel and a wave downstream of the Wittelsbacherbrücke bridge.

Other sports

Starting in 2023, Munich will have a team enter into the European League of Football, a professional American football league with teams throughout Europe.

Culture

Language

The Bavarian dialects are spoken in and around Munich, with its variety West Middle Bavarian or Old Bavarian (Westmittelbairisch / Altbairisch). Austro-Bavarian has no official status by the Bavarian authorities or local government, yet is recognised by the SIL and has its own ISO-639 code.

Museums

The Deutsches Museum or German Museum, located on an island in the River Isar, is the largest and one of the oldest science museums in the world. Three redundant exhibition buildings that are under a protection order were converted to house the Verkehrsmuseum, which houses the land transport collections of the Deutsches Museum. Deutsches Museum's Flugwerft Schleissheim flight exhibition centre is located nearby, on the Schleissheim Special Landing Field. Several non-centralised museums (many of those are public collections at Ludwig-Maximilians-Universität) show the expanded state collections of palaeontology, geology, mineralogy, zoology, botany and anthropology.

The city has several important art galleries, most of which can be found in the Kunstareal, including the Alte Pinakothek, the Neue Pinakothek, the Pinakothek der Moderne and the Museum Brandhorst. The Alte Pinakothek contains a treasure trove of the works of European masters between the 14th and 18th centuries. The collection reflects the eclectic tastes of the Wittelsbachs over four centuries and is sorted by schools over two floors. Major displays include Albrecht Dürer's Christ-like Self-Portrait (1500), his Four Apostles, Raphael's paintings The Canigiani Holy Family and Madonna Tempi as well as Peter Paul Rubens large Judgment Day. The gallery houses one of the world's most comprehensive Rubens collections. The Lenbachhaus houses works by the group of Munich-based modernist artists known as Der Blaue Reiter (The Blue Rider). 

An important collection of Greek and Roman art is held in the Glyptothek and the Staatliche Antikensammlung (State Antiquities Collection). King Ludwig I managed to acquire such pieces as the Medusa Rondanini, the Barberini Faun and figures from the Temple of Aphaea on Aegina for the Glyptothek. Another important museum in the Kunstareal is the Egyptian Museum.

The gothic Morris dancers of Erasmus Grasser are exhibited in the Munich City Museum in the old gothic arsenal building in the inner city.

Another area for the arts next to the Kunstareal is the Lehel quarter between the old town and the river Isar: the Museum Five Continents in Maximilianstraße is the second largest collection in Germany of artefacts and objects from outside Europe, while the Bavarian National Museum and the adjoining Bavarian State Archaeological Collection in Prinzregentenstraße rank among Europe's major art and cultural history museums. The nearby Schackgalerie is an important gallery of German 19th-century paintings.

The former Dachau concentration camp is  outside the city.

Arts and literature

Munich is a major international cultural centre and has played host to many prominent composers including Orlando di Lasso, W.A. Mozart, Carl Maria von Weber, Richard Wagner, Gustav Mahler, Richard Strauss, Max Reger and Carl Orff. With the Munich Biennale founded by Hans Werner Henze, and the A*DEvantgarde festival, the city still contributes to modern music theatre. Some of classical music's best-known pieces have been created in and around Munich by composers born in the area, for example, Richard Strauss's tone poem Also sprach Zarathustra or Carl Orff's Carmina Burana.

At the Nationaltheater several of Richard Wagner's operas were premiered under the patronage of Ludwig II of Bavaria. It is the home of the Bavarian State Opera and the Bavarian State Orchestra. Next door, the modern Residenz Theatre was erected in the building that had housed the Cuvilliés Theatre before World War II. Many operas were staged there, including the premiere of Mozart's Idomeneo in 1781. The Gärtnerplatz Theatre is a ballet and musical state theatre while another opera house, the Prinzregententheater, has become the home of the Bavarian Theatre Academy and the Munich Chamber Orchestra.

The modern Gasteig centre houses the Munich Philharmonic Orchestra. The third orchestra in Munich with international importance is the Bavarian Radio Symphony Orchestra. Its primary concert venue is the Herkulessaal in the former city royal residence, the Munich Residenz. Many important conductors have been attracted by the city's orchestras, including Felix Weingartner, Hans Pfitzner, Hans Rosbaud, Hans Knappertsbusch, Sergiu Celibidache, James Levine, Christian Thielemann, Lorin Maazel, Rafael Kubelík, Eugen Jochum, Sir Colin Davis, Mariss Jansons, Bruno Walter, Georg Solti, Zubin Mehta and Kent Nagano. A stage for shows, big events and musicals is the Deutsche Theater. It is Germany's largest theatre for guest performances.

Munich's contributions to modern popular music are often overlooked in favour of its strong association with classical music, but they are numerous: the city has had a strong music scene in the 1960s and 1970s, with many internationally renowned bands and musicians frequently performing in its clubs.

Furthermore, Munich was the centre of Krautrock in southern Germany, with many important bands such as Amon Düül II, Embryo or Popol Vuh hailing from the city. In the 1970s, the Musicland Studios developed into one of the most prominent recording studios in the world, with bands such as the Rolling Stones, Led Zeppelin, Deep Purple and Queen recording albums there. Munich also played a significant role in the development of electronic music, with genre pioneer Giorgio Moroder, who invented synth disco and electronic dance music, and Donna Summer, one of disco music's most important performers, both living and working in the city. In the late 1990s, Electroclash was substantially co-invented if not even invented in Munich, when DJ Hell introduced and assembled international pioneers of this musical genre through his International DeeJay Gigolo Records label here.

Other notable musicians and bands from Munich include Konstantin Wecker, Willy Astor, Spider Murphy Gang, Münchener Freiheit, Lou Bega, Megaherz, FSK, Colour Haze and Sportfreunde Stiller.

Music is so important in the Bavarian capital that the city hall gives permissions every day to ten musicians for performing in the streets around Marienplatz. This is how performers such as Olga Kholodnaya and Alex Jacobowitz are entertaining the locals and the tourists every day.

Next to the Bavarian Staatsschauspiel in the Residenz Theatre (Residenztheater), the Munich Kammerspiele in the Schauspielhaus is one of the most important German-language theatres in the world. Since Gotthold Ephraim Lessing's premieres in 1775 many important writers have staged their plays in Munich such as Christian Friedrich Hebbel, Henrik Ibsen and Hugo von Hofmannsthal.

The city is known as the second-largest publishing centre in the world (around 250 publishing houses have offices in the city), and many national and international publications are published in Munich, such as Arts in Munich, LAXMag and Prinz.

At the turn of the 20th century, Munich, and especially its suburb of Schwabing, was the preeminent cultural metropolis of Germany. Its importance as a centre for both literature and the fine arts was second to none in Europe, with numerous German and non-German artists moving there. For example, Wassily Kandinsky chose Munich over Paris to study at the Akademie der Bildenden Künste München, and, along with many other painters and writers living in Schwabing at that time, had a profound influence on modern art.

Prominent literary figures worked in Munich especially during the final decades of the Kingdom of Bavaria, the so-called Prinzregentenzeit (literally "prince regent's time") under the reign of Luitpold, Prince Regent of Bavaria, a period often described as a cultural Golden Age for both Munich and Bavaria as a whole. Some of the most notable were Thomas Mann, Heinrich Mann, Paul Heyse, Rainer Maria Rilke, Ludwig Thoma, Fanny zu Reventlow, Oskar Panizza, Gustav Meyrink, Max Halbe, Erich Mühsam and Frank Wedekind.

For a short while, Vladimir Lenin lived in Schwabing, where he wrote and published his most important work, What Is to Be Done? Central to Schwabing's bohemian scene (although they were actually often located in the nearby Maxvorstadt quarter) were Künstlerlokale (artist's cafés) like Café Stefanie or Kabarett Simpl, whose liberal ways differed fundamentally from Munich's more traditional localities. The Simpl, which survives to this day (although with little relevance to the city's contemporary art scene), was named after Munich's anti-authoritarian satirical magazine Simplicissimus, founded in 1896 by Albert Langen and Thomas Theodor Heine, which quickly became an important organ of the Schwabinger Bohème. Its caricatures and biting satirical attacks on Wilhelmine German society were the result of countless of collaborative efforts by many of the best visual artists and writers from Munich and elsewhere.

The period immediately before World War I saw continued economic and cultural prominence for the city. Thomas Mann wrote in his novella Gladius Dei about this period: "München leuchtete" (literally "Munich shone"). Munich remained a centre of cultural life during the Weimar period, with figures such as Lion Feuchtwanger, Bertolt Brecht, Peter Paul Althaus, Stefan George, Ricarda Huch, Joachim Ringelnatz, Oskar Maria Graf, Annette Kolb, Ernst Toller, Hugo Ball and Klaus Mann adding to the already established big names. Karl Valentin was Germany's most important cabaret performer and comedian and is to this day well-remembered and beloved as a cultural icon of his hometown. Between 1910 and 1940, he wrote and performed in many absurdist sketches and short films that were highly influential, earning him the nickname of "Charlie Chaplin of Germany". Many of Valentin's works wouldn't be imaginable without his congenial female partner Liesl Karlstadt, who often played male characters to hilarious effect in their sketches. After World War II, Munich soon again became a focal point of the German literary scene and remains so to this day, with writers as diverse as Wolfgang Koeppen, Erich Kästner, Eugen Roth, Alfred Andersch, Elfriede Jelinek, Hans Magnus Enzensberger, Michael Ende, Franz Xaver Kroetz, Gerhard Polt and Patrick Süskind calling the city their home.

From the Gothic to the Baroque era, the fine arts were represented in Munich by artists like Erasmus Grasser, Jan Polack, Johann Baptist Straub, Ignaz Günther, Hans Krumpper, Ludwig von Schwanthaler, Cosmas Damian Asam, Egid Quirin Asam, Johann Baptist Zimmermann, Johann Michael Fischer and François de Cuvilliés. Munich had already become an important place for painters like Carl Rottmann, Lovis Corinth, Wilhelm von Kaulbach, Carl Spitzweg, Franz von Lenbach, Franz von Stuck, Karl Piloty and Wilhelm Leibl when Der Blaue Reiter (The Blue Rider), a group of expressionist artists, was established in Munich in 1911. The city was home to the Blue Rider's painters Paul Klee, Wassily Kandinsky, Alexej von Jawlensky, Gabriele Münter, Franz Marc, August Macke and Alfred Kubin. Kandinsky's first abstract painting was created in Schwabing.

Munich was (and in some cases, still is) home to many of the most important authors of the New German Cinema movement, including Rainer Werner Fassbinder, Werner Herzog, Edgar Reitz and Herbert Achternbusch. In 1971, the Filmverlag der Autoren was founded, cementing the city's role in the movement's history. Munich served as the location for many of Fassbinder's films, among them Ali: Fear Eats the Soul. The Hotel Deutsche Eiche near Gärtnerplatz was somewhat like a centre of operations for Fassbinder and his "clan" of actors. New German Cinema is considered by far the most important artistic movement in German cinema history since the era of German Expressionism in the 1920s.

In 1919, the Bavaria Film Studios were founded, which developed into one of Europe's largest film studios. Directors like Alfred Hitchcock, Billy Wilder, Orson Welles, John Huston, Ingmar Bergman, Stanley Kubrick, Claude Chabrol, Fritz Umgelter, Rainer Werner Fassbinder, Wolfgang Petersen and Wim Wenders made films there. Among the internationally well-known films produced at the studios are The Pleasure Garden (1925) by Alfred Hitchcock, The Great Escape (1963) by John Sturges, Paths of Glory (1957) by Stanley Kubrick, Willy Wonka & the Chocolate Factory (1971) by Mel Stuart and both Das Boot (1981) and The Neverending Story (1984) by Wolfgang Petersen. Munich remains one of the centres of the German film and entertainment industry.

Festivals

Annual "High End Munich" trade show.

Starkbierfest
March and April, city-wide: Starkbierfest is held for three weeks during Lent, between Carnival and Easter, celebrating Munich's “strong beer”. Starkbier was created in 1651 by the local Paulaner monks who drank this 'Flüssiges Brot', or ‘liquid bread’ to survive the fasting of Lent. It became a public festival in 1751 and is now the second largest beer festival in Munich. Starkbierfest is also known as the “fifth season”, and is celebrated in beer halls and restaurants around the city.

Frühlingsfest
April and May, Theresienwiese:
Held for two weeks from the end of April to the beginning of May, Frühlingsfest celebrates spring and the new local spring beers, and is commonly referred to as the "little sister of Oktoberfest". There are two beer tents, Hippodrom and Festhalle Bayernland, as well as one roofed beer garden, Münchner Weißbiergarten. There are also roller coasters, fun houses, slides, and a Ferris wheel. Other attractions of the festival include a flea market on the festival's first Saturday, a “Beer Queen” contest, a vintage car show on the first Sunday, fireworks every Friday night, and a "Day of Traditions" on the final day.

Auer Dult

May, August, and October, Mariahilfplatz: Auer Dult is Europe's largest jumble sale, with fairs of its kind dating back to the 14th century. The Auer Dult is a traditional market with 300 stalls selling handmade crafts, household goods, and local foods, and offers carnival rides for children. It has taken place over nine days each, three times a year. since 1905.

Kocherlball
July, English Garden:
Traditionally a ball for Munich's domestic servants, cooks, nannies, and other household staff, Kocherlball, or ‘cook’s ball’ was a chance for the lower classes to take the morning off and dance together before the families of their households woke up. It now runs between 6 and 10 am the third Sunday in July at the Chinese Tower in Munich's English Garden.

Tollwood

July and December, Olympia Park: For three weeks in July, and then three weeks in December, Tollwood showcases fine and performing arts with live music, circus acts, and several lanes of booths selling handmade crafts, as well as organic international cuisine. According to the festival's website, Tollwood's goal is to promote culture and the environment, with the main themes of "tolerance, internationality, and openness". To promote these ideals, 70% of all Tollwood events and attractions are free.

Oktoberfest
September and October, Theresienwiese: The largest beer festival in the world, Munich's Oktoberfest runs for 16–18 days from the end of September through early October. Oktoberfest is a celebration of the wedding of Bavarian Crown Prince Ludwig to Princess Therese of Saxony-Hildburghausen which took place on 12 October 1810. In the last 200 years the festival has grown to span 85 acres and now welcomes over 6 million visitors every year. There are 14 beer tents which together can seat 119,000 attendees at a time, and serve beer from the six major breweries of Munich: Augustiner, Hacker-Pschorr, Löwenbräu, Paulaner, Spaten and Staatliches Hofbräuhaus. Over 7 million liters of beer are consumed at each Oktoberfest. There are also over 100 rides ranging from bumper cars to full-sized roller coasters, as well as the more traditional Ferris wheels and swings. Food can be bought in each tent, as well as at various stalls throughout the fairgrounds. Oktoberfest hosts 144 caterers and employees 13,000 people.

Christkindlmarkt
November and December, city-wide: Munich's Christmas Markets, or Christkindlmärkte, are held throughout the city from late November until Christmas Eve, the largest spanning the Marienplatz and surrounding streets. There are hundreds of stalls selling handmade goods, Christmas ornaments and decorations, and Bavarian Christmas foods including pastries, roasted nuts, and gluwein.

Mini-Munich
Late-July to mid-August, city-wide: Mini-Munich provides kids ages 7–15 with the opportunity to participate in a Spielstadt, the German term for a miniature city composed almost entirely of children. Funded by Kultur & Spielraum, this play city is run by young Germans performing the same duties as adults, including voting in city council, paying taxes, and building businesses. The experimental game was invented in Munich in the 1970s and has since spread to other countries like Egypt and China.

Coopers' Dance

The Coopers' Dance is a guild dance of coopers originally started in Munich. Since early 1800s the custom spread via journeymen in it is now a common tradition over the Old Bavaria region. The dance was supposed to be held every 7 years.

Cultural history trails and bicycle routes
Since 2001, historically interesting places in Munich can be explored via the cultural history trails (KulturGeschichtsPfade). Sign-posted cycle routes are the Outer Äußere Radlring (outer cycle route) and the RadlRing München.

Cuisine and culinary specialities

The Munich cuisine contributes to the Bavarian cuisine. Munich Weisswurst ("white sausage", German: Münchner Weißwurst) was invented here in 1857. It is a Munich speciality. Traditionally eaten only before noon – a tradition dating to a time before refrigerators – these morsels are often served with sweet mustard and freshly baked pretzels.

Munich offers 11 restaurants that have been awarded one or more Michelin stars in the Michelin Guide of 2021.

Beers and breweries

Munich is known for its breweries and the Weissbier (or Weißbier / Weizenbier, wheat beer) is a speciality from Bavaria. Helles, a pale lager with a translucent gold colour is the most popular Munich beer today, although it's not old (only introduced in 1895) and is the result of a change in beer tastes. Helles has largely replaced Munich's dark beer, Dunkles, which gets its colour from roasted malt. It was the typical beer in Munich in the 19th century, but it is now more of a speciality. Starkbier is the strongest Munich beer, with 6%–9% alcohol content. It is dark amber in colour and has a heavy malty taste. It is available and is sold particularly during the Lenten Starkbierzeit (strong beer season), which begins on or before St. Joseph's Day (19 March). The beer served at Oktoberfest is a special type of Märzen beer with a higher alcohol content than regular Helles.

There are countless Wirtshäuser (traditional Bavarian ale houses/restaurants) all over the city area, many of which also have small outside areas. Biergärten (beer gardens) are popular fixtures of Munich's gastronomic landscape. They are central to the city's culture and serve as a kind of melting pot for members of all walks of life, for locals, expatriates and tourists alike. It is allowed to bring one's own food to a beer garden, however, it is forbidden to bring one's own drinks. There are many smaller beer gardens and around twenty major ones, providing at least a thousand seats, with four of the largest in the Englischer Garten: Chinesischer Turm (Munich's second-largest beer garden with 7,000 seats), Seehaus, Hirschau and Aumeister. Nockherberg, Hofbräukeller (not to be confused with the Hofbräuhaus) and Löwenbräukeller are other beer gardens. Hirschgarten is the largest beer garden in the world, with 8,000 seats.

There are six main breweries in Munich: Augustiner-Bräu, Hacker-Pschorr, Hofbräu, Löwenbräu, Paulaner and Spaten-Franziskaner-Bräu (separate brands Spaten and Franziskaner, the latter of which mainly for Weissbier).

Also much consumed, though not from Munich and thus without the right to have a tent at the Oktoberfest, are Tegernseer and Schneider Weisse, the latter of which has a major beer hall in Munich. Smaller breweries are becoming more prevalent in Munich, such as Giesinger Bräu. However, these breweries do not have tents at Oktoberfest.

Circus
The Circus Krone based in Munich is one of the largest circuses in Europe. It was the first and still is one of only a few in Western Europe to also occupy a building of its own.

Nightlife

Nightlife in Munich is located mostly in the boroughs Ludwigsvorstadt-Isarvorstadt, Maxvorstadt, Au-Haidhausen, Berg am Laim and Sendling. Between Sendlinger Tor and Maximiliansplatz, on the edge of the central Altstadt-Lehel district, there is also the so-called Feierbanane (party banana), a roughly banana-shaped unofficial party zone spanning  along Sonnenstraße, characterized by a high concentration of clubs, bars and restaurants, which became the center of Munich's nightlife in the mid-2000s.

In the 1960s and 1970s, Schwabing was considered a center of nightlife in Germany, with internationally known clubs such as Big Apple, PN hit-house, Domicile, Hot Club, Piper Club, Tiffany, Germany's first large-scale discotheque Blow Up and the underwater nightclub Yellow Submarine, and Munich has been called "New York's big disco sister" in this context. Bars in the Schwabing district of this era include, among many others, Schwabinger 7 and Schwabinger Podium. Since the 1980s, however, Schwabing has lost much of its nightlife activity due to gentrification and the resulting high rents, and the formerly wild artists' and students' quarter developed into one of the city's most coveted and expensive residential districts, attracting affluent citizens with little interest in partying.

Since the 1960s, the Rosa Viertel (pink quarter) developed in the Glockenbachviertel and around Gärtnerplatz, which in the 1980s made Munich "one of the four gayest metropolises in the world" along with San Francisco, New York City and Amsterdam. In particular, the area around Müllerstraße and Hans-Sachs-Straße was characterized by numerous gay bars and nightclubs. One of them was the travesty nightclub Old Mrs. Henderson, where Freddie Mercury, who lived in Munich from 1979 to 1985, filmed the music video for the song Living on My Own at his 39th birthday party. Transsexual icon Romy Haag had a club in the city centre for many years.

Since the mid-1990s, the Kunstpark Ost and its successor Kultfabrik, a former industrial complex that was converted to a large party area near München Ostbahnhof in Berg am Laim, hosted more than 30 clubs and was especially popular among younger people from the metropolitan area surrounding Munich and tourists. The Kultfabrik was closed at the end of the year 2015 to convert the area into a residential and office area. Apart from the Kultfarbik and the smaller Optimolwerke, there is a wide variety of establishments in the urban parts of nearby Haidhausen. Before the Kunstpark Ost, there had already been an accumulation of internationally known nightclubs in the remains of the abandoned former Munich-Riem Airport.

Munich nightlife tends to change dramatically and quickly. Establishments open and close every year, and due to gentrification and the overheated housing market many survive only a few years, while others last longer. Beyond the already mentioned venues of the 1960s and 1970s, nightclubs with international recognition in recent history included Tanzlokal Größenwahn, Atomic Cafe and the techno clubs Babalu Club, Ultraschall, Die Registratur and Bob Beaman. From 1995 to 2001, Munich was also home to the Union Move, one of the largest technoparades in Germany.

Munich has the highest density of music venues of any German city, followed by Hamburg, Cologne and Berlin. Within the city's limits are more than 100 nightclubs and thousands of bars and restaurants.

Some notable nightclubs are: popular techno clubs are Blitz Club, Harry Klein, Rote Sonne, Bahnwärter Thiel, Pimpernel, Charlie, Palais and Pathos. Popular mixed music clubs are Call me Drella, Wannda Circus, Tonhalle, Backstage, Muffathalle, Ampere, Pacha, P1, Zenith, Minna Thiel and the party ship Alte Utting. Some notable bars (pubs are located all over the city) are Schumann's Bar, Havana Club, Sehnsucht, Bar Centrale, Holy Home, Negroni, Die Goldene Bar and Bei Otto.

Education

Colleges and universities

Munich is a leading location for science and research with a long list of Nobel Prize laureates from Wilhelm Conrad Röntgen in 1901 to Theodor Hänsch in 2005. Munich has become a spiritual centre already since the times of Emperor Louis IV when philosophers like Michael of Cesena, Marsilius of Padua and William of Ockham were protected at the emperor's court. The Ludwig Maximilian University (LMU) and the Technische Universität München (TUM), were two of the first three German universities to be awarded the title elite university by a selection committee composed of academics and members of the Ministries of Education and Research of the Federation and the German states (Länder). Only the two Munich universities and the Technical University of Karlsruhe (now part of Karlsruhe Institute of Technology) have held this honour, and the implied greater chances of attracting research funds, since the first evaluation round in 2006.

Ludwig Maximilian University of Munich (LMU), founded in 1472 in Ingolstadt, moved to Munich in 1826
Technical University of Munich (TUM), founded in 1868
Akademie der Bildenden Künste München, founded in 1808
Bundeswehr University Munich, founded in 1973 (located in Neubiberg)
Deutsche Journalistenschule, founded in 1959
Bayerische Akademie für Außenwirtschaft, founded in 1989
Hochschule für Musik und Theater München, founded in 1830
International Max Planck Research School for Molecular and Cellular Life Sciences, founded in 2005
International School of Management, founded in 1990
Katholische Stiftungsfachhochschule München, founded in 1971
Munich Business School (MBS), founded in 1991
Munich Intellectual Property Law Center (MIPLC), founded in 2003
Munich School of Philosophy, founded in 1925 in Pullach, moved to Munich in 1971
Munich School of Political Science, founded in 1950
Munich University of Applied Sciences (HM), founded in 1971
New European College, founded in 2014
Ukrainian Free University, founded in 1921 (from 1945 – in Munich)
University of Television and Film Munich (Hochschule für Fernsehen und Film), founded in 1966

Primary and secondary schools
Grundschulen in Munich:
Grundschule an der Gebelestraße
Grund- und Mittelschule an der Hochstraße
Grundschule an der Kirchenstraße
Grundschule Flurstraße
Grundschule an der Stuntzstraße
Ernst-Reuter-Grundschule
Grundschule Gertrud Bäumer Straße
Grundschule an der Südlichen Auffahrtsallee
Gymnasien in Munich:
Pestalozzi-Gymnasium
Maria-Theresia-Gymnasium
Gymnasium Max-Josef-Stift
Luitpold Gymnasium
Edith-Stein-Gymnasium der Erzdiözese München und Freising
Maximiliansgymnasium
Oskar-von-Miller-Gymnasium
Städtisches St.-Anna-Gymnasium
Wilhelmsgymnasium
Städtisches Luisengymnasium
Wittelsbacher Gymnasium
Albert-Einstein-Gymnasium
Realschulen in Munich:
Städt. Fridtjof-Nansen-Realschule
Städtische Adalbert-Stifter-Realschule
Maria Ward Mädchenrealschule
Städtische Ricarda-Huch-Realschule
Isar Realschule München
Städtische Hermann-Frieb Realschule

International schools in Munich:
Lycée Jean Renoir (French school)
Japanische Internationale Schule München
Bavarian International School
Munich International School
European School, Munich

Scientific research institutions

Max Planck Society
The Max Planck Society, an independent German non-profit research organisation, has its administrative headquarters in Munich. The following institutes are located in the Munich area:
Max Planck Institute for Astrophysics, Garching
Max Planck Institute of Biochemistry, Martinsried
Max Planck Institute for Extraterrestrial Physics, Garching
Max Planck Institute for Foreign and International Social Law, München
Max Planck Institute for Innovation and Competition, München
Max Planck Institute of Neurobiology, Martinsried
Max Planck Institute for Ornithology, Andechs-Erling (Biological Rhythms and Behaviour), Radolfzell, Seewiesen (Reproductive Biology and Behaviour)
Max Planck Institute for Physics (Werner Heisenberg Institute), München
Max Planck Institute for Plasma Physics, Garching (also in Greifswald)
Max Planck Institute of Psychiatry, München
Max Planck Institute for Psychological Research, München (closed)
Max Planck Institute of Quantum Optics, Garching

Fraunhofer Society
The Fraunhofer Society, the German non-profit research organization for applied research, has its headquarters in Munich. The following institutes are located in the Munich area:
Applied and Integrated Security – AISEC
Embedded Systems and Communication - ESK
Modular Solid-State Technologies - EMFT
Building Physics – IBP
Process Engineering and Packaging – IVV

Other research institutes

Botanische Staatssammlung München, a notable herbarium
Ifo Institute for Economic Research, theoretical and applied research in economics and finance
Doerner Institute
European Southern Observatory
Helmholtz Zentrum München
Zoologische Staatssammlung München
German Aerospace Center (GSOC), Oberpfaffenhofen bei München

Economy

Munich has the strongest economy of any German city according to a study and the lowest unemployment rate (5.4% in July 2020) of any German city of more than a million people (the others being Berlin, Hamburg and Cologne). Munich ranks third on the list of German cities by gross domestic product (GDP). In addition, it is one of the most attractive business locations in Germany. The city is also the economic centre of southern Germany. Munich topped the ranking of the magazine Capital in February 2005 for the economic prospects between 2002 and 2011 in 60 German cities.

Munich is a financial center and global city that holds the headquarters of many companies. This includes more companies listed by the DAX than any other German city, as well as the German or European headquarters of many foreign companies such as McDonald's and Microsoft. One of the best-known newly established Munich companies is Flixbus.

Manufacturing
Munich holds the headquarters of Siemens AG (electronics), BMW (car), MAN AG (truck manufacturer, engineering), MTU Aero Engines (aircraft engine manufacturer), Linde (gases) and Rohde & Schwarz (electronics). Among German cities with more than 500,000 inhabitants, purchasing power is highest in Munich (€26,648 per inhabitant) . In 2006, Munich blue-collar workers enjoyed an average hourly wage of €18.62 (ca. $20).

The breakdown by cities proper (not metropolitan areas) of Global 500 cities listed Munich in 8th position in 2009. Munich is also a centre for biotechnology, software and other service industries. Furthermore, Munich is the home of the headquarters of many other large companies such as the injection moulding machine manufacturer Krauss-Maffei, the camera and lighting manufacturer Arri, the semiconductor firm Infineon Technologies (headquartered in the suburban town of Neubiberg), lighting giant Osram, as well as the German or European headquarters of many foreign companies such as Microsoft.

Finance
Munich has significance as a financial centre (second only to Frankfurt), being home of HypoVereinsbank and the Bayerische Landesbank. It outranks Frankfurt though as home of insurance companies such as Allianz (insurance) and Munich Re (re-insurance).

Media
Munich is the largest publishing city in Europe and home to the Süddeutsche Zeitung, one of Germany's biggest daily newspapers. The city is also the location of the programming headquarters of Germany's largest public broadcasting network, ARD, while the largest commercial network, Pro7-Sat1 Media AG, is headquartered in the suburb of Unterföhring. The headquarters of the German branch of Random House, the world's largest publishing house, and of Burda publishing group are also in Munich.

The Bavaria Film Studios are located in the suburb of Grünwald. They are one of Europe's biggest film production studios.

Quality of life
Most Munich residents enjoy a high quality of life. Mercer HR Consulting consistently rates the city among the top 10 cities with the highest quality of life worldwide – a 2011 survey ranked Munich as 4th. In 2007 the same company also ranked Munich as the 39th most expensive in the world and most expensive major city in Germany. Munich enjoys a thriving economy, driven by the information technology, biotechnology, and publishing sectors. Environmental pollution is low, although  the city council is concerned about levels of particulate matter (PM), especially along the city's major thoroughfares. Since the enactment of EU legislation concerning the concentration of particulate in the air, environmental groups such as Greenpeace have staged large protest rallies to urge the city council and the State government to take a harder stance on pollution. Due to the high standard of living in and the thriving economy of the city and the region, there was an influx of people and Munich's population surpassed 1.5 million by June 2015, an increase of more than 20% in 10 years.

Transport
Munich has an extensive public transport system consisting of an underground metro, trams, buses and high-speed rail. In 2015, the transport modal share in Munich was 38 percent public transport, 25 percent car, 23 percent walking, and 15 percent bicycle. Its public transport system delivered 566 million passenger trips that year. Munich is the hub of a well-developed regional transportation system, including the second-largest airport in Germany and the Berlin–Munich high-speed railway, which connects Munich to the German capital city with a journey time of about 4 hours. The trade fair transport logistic is held every two years at the Neue Messe München (Messe München International). Flixmobility which offers intercity coach service is headquartered in Munich.

Public transport

For its urban population of 2.6 million people, Munich and its closest suburbs have a comprehensive network of public transport incorporating the Munich U-Bahn (underground railway), the Munich S-Bahn (suburban trains), trams and buses. The system is supervised by the Munich Transport and Tariff Association (Münchner Verkehrs- und Tarifverbund GmbH). The Munich tramway is the oldest existing public transportation system in the city, which has been in operation since 1876. Munich also has an extensive network of bus lines.

The extensive network of subway and tram lines assists and complement pedestrian movement in the city centre. The 700m-long Kaufinger Straße, which starts near the Main train station, forms a pedestrian east–west spine that traverses almost the entire centre. Similarly, Weinstraße leads off northwards to the Hofgarten. These major spines and many smaller streets cover an extensive area of the centre that can be enjoyed on foot and bike. The transformation of the historic area into a pedestrian priority zone enables and invites walking and biking by making these active modes of transport comfortable, safe and enjoyable. These attributes result from applying the principle of "filtered permeability", which selectively restricts the number of roads that run through the centre. While certain streets are discontinuous for cars, they connect to a network of pedestrian and bike paths, which permeate the entire centre. In addition, these paths go through public squares and open spaces increasing the enjoyment of the trip (see image). The logic of filtering a mode of transport is fully expressed in a comprehensive model for laying out neighbourhoods and districts – the fused grid.

Statistics
The average amount of time people spend commuting to and from work with public transit in Munich on a weekday is 56 min. 11% of public transit users, spend more than two hours travelling each day. The average amount of time people wait at a stop or station for public transit is ten minutes, whilst 6% of passengers wait for over twenty minutes on average every day. The average distance people usually ride in a single trip with public transit is 9.2 km, while 21% travel for over 12 km in a single direction.

Cycling

Cycling has a strong presence in the city and is recognised as a good alternative to motorised transport. The growing number of bicycle lanes are widely used throughout the year. Cycle paths can be found alongside the majority of sidewalks and streets, although the newer and/or renovated ones are much easier to tell apart from pavements than older ones. The cycle paths usually involve a longer route than by the road, as they are diverted around objects, and the presence of pedestrians can make them quite slow.

A modern bike hire system is available within the area bounded by the Mittlerer Ring.

München Hauptbahnhof

München Hauptbahnhof is the main railway station located in the city centre and is one of three long-distance stations in Munich, the others being München Ost (to the east) and München-Pasing (to the west). All stations are connected to the public transport system and serve as transportation hubs.

München Hauptbahnhof serves about 450,000 passengers a day, which puts it on par with other large stations in Germany, such as Hamburg Hauptbahnhof and Frankfurt Hauptbahnhof. It and München Ost are two of the 21 stations in Germany classified by Deutsche Bahn as a category 1 station. The mainline station is a terminal station with 32 platforms. The subterranean S-Bahn with 2 platforms and U-Bahn stations with 6 platforms are through stations.

ICE highspeed trains stop at Munich-Pasing and Munich-Hauptbahnhof only. InterCity and EuroCity trains to destinations east of Munich also stop at Munich East. Since 28 May 2006 Munich has been connected to Nuremberg via Ingolstadt by the  Nuremberg–Munich high-speed railway line. In 2017, the Berlin–Munich high-speed railway opened, providing a journey time of less than 4 hours between the two German cities.

Autobahns

Munich is an integral part of the motorway network of southern Germany. Motorways from Stuttgart (W), Nuremberg, Frankfurt and Berlin (N), Deggendorf and Passau (E), Salzburg and Innsbruck (SE), Garmisch Partenkirchen (S) and Lindau (SW) terminate at Munich, allowing direct access to the different parts of Germany, Austria and Italy.

Traffic, however, is often very heavy in and around Munich. Traffic jams are commonplace during rush hour as well as at the beginning and end of major holidays in Germany. There are few "green waves" or roundabouts, and the city's prosperity often causes an abundance of obstructive construction sites. Other contributing factors are the extraordinarily high rates of car ownership per capita (multiple times that of Berlin), the city's historically grown and largely preserved centralised urban structure, which leads to a very high concentration of traffic in specific areas, and sometimes poor planning (for example bad traffic light synchronisation and a less than ideal ring road).

Air

Munich International Airport

Franz Josef Strauss International Airport (IATA: MUC, ICAO: EDDM) is the second-largest airport in Germany and seventh-largest in Europe after London Heathrow, Paris Charles de Gaulle, Frankfurt, Amsterdam, Madrid and Istanbul Atatürk. It replaced the smaller Munich-Riem airport in 1992. The airport can be reached by suburban train lines from the city. From the main railway station the journey takes 40–45 minutes. An express train will be added that will cut down travel time to 20–25 minutes with limited stops on dedicated tracks. Lufthansa opened its second hub at the airport when Terminal 2 was opened in 2003.

Other airports
In 2008, the Bavarian state government granted a licence to expand Oberpfaffenhofen Air Station located west of Munich, for commercial use. These plans were opposed by many residents in the Oberpfaffenhofen area as well as other branches of local Government, including the city of Munich, which took the case to court. However, in October 2009, the permit allowing up to 9725 business flights per year to depart from or land at Oberpfaffenhofen was confirmed by a regional judge.

Despite being  from Munich, Memmingen Airport has been advertised as Airport Munich West. After 2005, passenger traffic of nearby Augsburg Airport was relocated to Munich Airport, leaving the Augsburg region of Bavaria without an air passenger airport within close reach.

Around Munich

Nearby towns
The Munich agglomeration sprawls across the plain of the Alpine foothills comprising about 2.6 million inhabitants. Several smaller traditional Bavarian towns and cities like Dachau, Freising, Erding, Starnberg, Landshut and Moosburg are today part of the Greater Munich Region, formed by Munich and the surrounding districts, making up the Munich Metropolitan Region, which has a population of about 6 million people.

Recreation

South of Munich, there are numerous nearby freshwater lakes such as Lake Starnberg, Ammersee, Chiemsee, Walchensee, Kochelsee, Tegernsee, Schliersee, Simssee, Staffelsee, Wörthsee, Kirchsee and the Osterseen (Easter Lakes), which are popular among Munich residents for recreation, swimming and watersports and can be quickly reached by car and a few also by Munich's S-Bahn.

Notable people

Born in Munich

Notable residents

Twin towns and sister cities

Munich is twinned with:

 Edinburgh, United Kingdom (1954)
 Verona, Italy (1960)
 Bordeaux, France (1964)
 Sapporo, Japan (1972)
 Cincinnati, United States (1989)
 Kyiv, Ukraine (1989)
 Harare, Zimbabwe (1996)
 Beersheba, Israel (2021)

See also

Outline of Munich

Notes

References

External links

Official website for the City of Munich
München Wiki – open city wiki for Munich with more than 15,000 articles 
On the brink: Munich 1918–1919
Munichfound – magazine for English speaking Münchners
Destination Munich – online guide
Historical Atlas of Munich

Photos
Europe Pictures – Munich
Geocoded Pictures of Munich 
Munich City Panoramas – panoramic views and virtual tpurs
Globosapiens Travel Community – travel tips
Tales from Toytown – photos of Munich
Munich photo gallery